San Guillermo Airport,  is an airport  northwest of Retiro, a town in the Maule Region of Chile.

See also

Transport in Chile
List of airports in Chile

References

External links
OpenStreetMap - San Guillermo
OurAirports - San Guillermo
FallingRain - San Guillermo Airport

Airports in Chile
Airports in Maule Region